The 2019 IHF Men's Youth World Championship (under-19) was the eighth edition of the tournament, held from 6 to 18 August 2019 in Skopje, North Macedonia.

Egypt won their first title by defeating Germany in the final.

Qualified teams

Draw
The draw was held on 29 May 2019 in Basel, Switzerland.

Seedings
The seedings were announced on 17 May 2019.

Preliminary round
All times are local (UTC+2).

Group A

Group B

Group C

Group D

President's Cup
17th place bracket

21st place bracket

21st–24th place semifinals

17th–20th place semifinals

23rd place game

21st place game

19th place game

17th place game

9–16th placement games
The eight losers of the round of 16 were seeded according to their results in the preliminary round against teams ranked 1–4 and play a elimination game to determine their final position.

Standings

15th place game

13th place game

Eleventh place game

Ninth place game

Knockout stage

Bracket

5th place bracket

Round of 16

Quarterfinals

5th–8th place semifinals

Semifinals

Seventh place game

Fifth place game

Third place game

Final

Final ranking

Statistics

Top goalscorers

Source: IHF

Top goalkeepers

Source: IHF

Awards
The MVP and all-star team were announced on 18 August 2019.

MVP
 Ahmed Hesham

Best defender
 Julian Koster

All-star team
Goalkeeper:  Abdelrahman Mohamed
Right wing:  Dániel Kecskés
Right back:  Martim Costa
Centre back:  Lauritz Reinholdt
Left back:  Hassan Walid
Left wing:  Alexander Reimann
Pivot:  Tom Bergner

References

External links
Official website 
IHF website

2019 Youth
Men's Youth World Handball Championship
International handball competitions hosted by North Macedonia
2019 in North Macedonia sport
Men's Youth World Handball